The cisterna magna (or cerebellomedullar cistern) is one of three principal openings in the subarachnoid space between the arachnoid and pia mater layers of the meninges surrounding the brain. The openings are collectively referred to as the subarachnoid cisterns. Cerebrospinal fluid produced in the fourth ventricle drains into the cisterna magna via the lateral apertures and median aperture.

The two other principal cisterns are the pontine cistern located between the pons and the medulla and the interpeduncular cistern located between the cerebral peduncles.

While the most commonly used clinical method for obtaining cerebrospinal fluid is a lumbar puncture, puncture of the cisterna magna may be performed in rare instances.

References

Meninges